Eric Lane may refer to:

 Eric Lane (actor) (born 1976), African American actor
 Eric Lane (academic) (born 1943), professor of public law and public service at Hofstra University
 Eric Lane (American football) (born 1959), former American football running back